Nam Seung-gu (born 25 November 1963) is a South Korean gymnast. He competed in eight events at the 1984 Summer Olympics.

References

1963 births
Living people
South Korean male artistic gymnasts
Olympic gymnasts of South Korea
Gymnasts at the 1984 Summer Olympics
Place of birth missing (living people)